The Houston Mayoral Election of 2003 took place to elect a successor to Mayor of Houston Lee Brown. An election was first held on November 4, 2003; as no candidate received a majority of the votes a runoff election was held on December 6, 2003 and resulted in the election of Former Deputy Secretary of Energy Bill White. The election was non-partisan.

Candidates

Former Deputy Secretary of Energy Bill White
Former City Council Member Orlando Sanchez
State Representative Sylvester Turner
Anthony Dutrow
John Worldpeace
Jack Terence
Luis Ullrich
Raymond Rodriguez

Polling

Primary

Runoff

Results

Notes

See also
 2009 Houston mayoral election
 Elections in Texas

Mayoral election, 2003
Houston mayoral
Houston
2003
Non-partisan elections